POTUS: Or, Behind Every Great Dumbass Are Seven Women Trying to Keep Him Alive is a play by Selina Fillinger that opened on Broadway on April 27, 2022 at the Shubert Theatre. The original Broadway production was directed by Susan Stroman and starred Lilli Cooper (Chris), Lea DeLaria (Bernadette), Rachel Dratch (Stephanie), Julianne Hough (Dusty), Suzy Nakamura (Jean), Julie White (Harriet), and Vanessa Williams (Margaret).

Plot summary
The show centers around a PR nightmare for the White House while seven women try to keep the President out of trouble.

Cast

Reception 
Jesse Green, chief theatre critic for The New York Times, gave the production a mixed review, stating, "As a farce, 'POTUS' still plays by old and almost definitionally male rules; farce is built on tropes of domination and violence. On the other hand, and more happily, 'POTUS' lets us experience the double-bind of exceptional women unmediated by the men who depend on their complicity." The Washington Post theatre critic Peter Marks compared the show favorably to that of a mix between Saturday Night Live and Veep. He also praised its cast and in particular its director Susan Stroman for orchestrating the chaos on stage, writing, "Veteran director Susan Stroman is a choreographer by training. She has the mechanics of farce down pat, a knowledge base that ensures this team at all times has clockwork timing in its arsenal."

The ensemble cast received acclaim for their comedic roles. Variety critic Marilyn Stasio praised DeLaria as "priceless" and "vivid enough to be memorable". Maureen Lee Lenker of Entertainment Weekly said, "Julianne Hough is particularly mesmerizing...[she] could easily be a mere stereotype, but she surprises at every turn." Deadline Hollywood praised White's performance describing her as "one of the stage’s great comic actors" and that she "uses her knife-sharp bark of a voice as a sort of aural embodiment of the chaos on stage". In the New York Post's mixed review, its critic Johnny Oleksinski heaped praise on Rachel Dratch's performance, writing, "The genius Dratch is a riot as a nervous, introverted employee who practices power stances and can’t get a word in edgewise. Then she accidentally downs a bunch of hallucinogenic pills she thought were Tums and goes completely loco. The 'SNL' alum running wide-eyed around the theater wearing an inner-tube is the best part of the play." White and Dratch both received Tony Award for Best Featured Actress in a Play nominations for their performances.

Awards and nominations

Original Broadway production

References

2022 plays
Broadway plays
American political plays